The Twangiza-Namoya gold belt is a belt of gold deposits in the east of the Democratic Republic of the Congo.
Artisanal working of alluvial deposits dates back to the 1920s.
More systematic exploration and exploitation took place in the colonial era and continues up to the present, although civil war and militia attacks have periodically disrupted operations and have caused several changes of ownership of the concessions.

Location

The  Twangiza-Namoya gold belt, also called the Maniema-South Kivu Gold Belt. stretches from South Kivu into Maniema.
It extends from Twangiza, South Kivu, in the northeast to Namoya, Maniema, in the southwest.
There are gold deposits at Kamituga, Lugushwa and other properties in the belt.
From Namoya the belt extends west towards Kampene.

Geology

The Twangiza–Namoya gold belt  is on the western margin of the Kibaran Mobile Belt, which lies between the Congo Craton and the Tanzania Craton.
It developed in the Proterozoic.
It holds a sedimentary sequence with felsic and mafic igneous rocks.
The basement was exposed several times to heat influxes during polyphase tectono-metamorphic episodes that mobilized hydrothermal fluids.
"G4" granites and pegmatites were formed during the transition from the Mesoproterozoic to the Neoproterozoic.
Gold mineralization is found in disseminated arsenopyrite and pyrite in quartz veins.

Discovery and exploitation

Gold deposits were found in the 1920s.
Exploitation of the Kamituga deposits by Minière des Grands Lacs Africains (MGL) began in 1932.
By 1955 MGL's cumulative production reached 54 tonnes of gold ingot.
Most of the workings were alluvial, but some followed veins.
The Société Minière et Industrielle du Kivu (Sominki) was created to hold all the mining assets in Kivu Province by a convention of 31 May 1974.
The merger was completed in March 1976, when Sominki took over Syndicat Miniere de l'Etain (Symetain).

In January 1996 African Mineral Resources Inc. (AMRI), a subsidiary of Banro Resource Corporation of Canada, and Mines D'Or du Zaire (MDDZ) bought the outstanding 64% of privately held shares of Sominki.
In December 1996 Banro acquired MDDZ's share.
Early in 1997 Société Aurifère du Kivu et du Maniema (Sakima) was created to acquire the gold assets of Sominki.
Banro held 93% of Sakima and the government held 7%.
In February 1997 Banro signed a convention with the Zaire government under which Sakima took over Sominki's mining projects.
On 29 March 1997 Sominki was put into liquidation.

In May 1997 the government of Mobutu Sese Seko was overthrown when Kinshasa fell to the forces of the Alliance of Democratic Forces for the Liberation of Congo (ADFL) led by Laurent-Désiré Kabila.
On 29 July 1998 Kabila expropriated Sakima's assets and transferred the mining licenses to the Société des Mines du Congo (Somico), a new state-owned enterprise.
In 2001 Joseph Kabila succeeded his father as president.
On 18 April 2002 Banro and the DRC government signed an Amicable Settlement Agreement.
Sakima was reinstated, with the government the sole owner.
Banro reacquired the gold concessions, and created four subsidiaries to exploit them.

Twangiza

Twangiza is an open-pit mine.
Proven and probable reserves are 1.82 million ounces of metal.
MGL collected 17,400 samples in total.
Under Banro the mine began commercial production on 1 September 2012.
In 2017 Banro almost went bankrupt and halted operations after a series of militia attacks.
In early 2018 a Canadian court allowed the Banro's main creditors to become its senior shareholders as part of a rescue plan.
These were Baiyin International Investment, controlled by the Chinese government, and Gramercy Funds Management of Connecticut, USA.
In January 2020 Banro sold the Twangize mine to Baiyin International Investments for a nominal $1, since the mine's liabilities were higher than its projected revenues.

Kamituga

Kamituga is in the Mwenga Territory, South Kivu. 
Gold deposits in the region were first discovered in the 1920s with the discovery of alluvial gold in the Luliaba, Mobale, Kahushimira, Kamakundu and Idoka rivers.
In the 1930s MGL started commercial gold exploitation of the Kamituga Mine.
Throughout the 1960s artisanal mining started to gradually expand in Kamituga. The company's workers realized they could sell gold in an informal trading system, instead of handing it over to the company for a low salary. For MGL, it was difficult to halt such ‘illegal’ activities as artisanal miners and traders were to a certain extent protected by local political and customary elites.

Lugushwa

The Lugushwa property is in Mwenga Territory, South Kivu.
Alluvial gold was found at Lugushwa in the 1920s.
Between 1957 and 1963 the Lugushwa region was explored and mined for alluvial gold.
After that, until the start of the First Congo War in 1966, it was explored for primary gold deposits.
Banro Corporation of Canada acquired control of the property in 1996.
In April 2019 Banro said it would soon start an infill drilling program, which would continue into 2020 and would be followed by a feasibility study.
The Banro CEO Brett Richards said that Lugushwa could potentially be the company's largest mine, producing over 250,000 ounces of gold per year for ten or more years.

Namoya

The Namoya Mine is in Kabambare Territory of Maniema,
It is at the south end of the Twangiza-Namoya gold belt.
Namoya Mining, a Banro subsidiary, obtained an exploration permit in 2004.
By December 2012 a total of 350 diamond boreholes had been completed, plus 2,074 auger holes.
Construction of the open pit mine and processing facilities began in the first quarter of 2012.
Commercial operations began in January 2016, and was forecast to produce 122,000oz of gold in the first five years.
Mai-Mai militiamen, who believe that blessed water can protect them from bullets, periodically attacked the Banro properties.
In 2018 they attacked trucks belonging to Namoya Mine.
In July 2019 they kidnapped two Namoya workers, one from South Africa and one from Zimbabwe.
In June 2020 Banro Corporation agreed to sell the mine to a consortium that included Baiyin International Investment and Shomka Resources.

Notes

Citations

Sources

 

 

Belt regions
Gold mining in the Democratic Republic of the Congo